Bill Gilmour or Billy Gilmour may refer to:

 Bill Gilmour (director) (born 1939), Scottish television director
 Bill Gilmour (politician) (born 1942), Canadian politician
 Billy Gilmour (born 2001), Scottish footballer
 Billy Gilmour (ice hockey) (1885–1959), Canadian ice hockey player

See also 
 Billy Gilmore (died 1978), American musician